Philip Mark Breedlove (born September 21, 1955) is a retired four-star general in the United States Air Force who served as the commander of U.S. European Command, as well as the 17th Supreme Allied Commander Europe (SACEUR) of NATO Allied Command Operations, from May 2013 until May 4, 2016. He previously served as the commander of U.S. Air Forces Europe, which he concurrently served as commander of U.S. Air Forces Africa, commander of Air Component Command, Ramstein, and director of Joint Air Power Competence Center. He previously served as the 36th vice chief of staff of the United States Air Force from January 14, 2011, to July 27, 2012.  On 10 May 2013, in a ceremony in Stuttgart, Germany, Breedlove took over the command of USEUCOM. Three days later, on May 13, 2013, he assumed command as SACEUR.

On 11 March 2017, NATO's Atlantic Council designated US Army General Curtis Scaparrotti as Breedlove's successor. Scaparrotti took command in Europe on 3 May 2017 (EUCOM) and on 4 May 2018 (SACEUR).

Biography

Early life
Breedlove was born in 1955 at Atlanta and raised in Forest Park, Georgia.  He received his commission after graduating from the Georgia Institute of Technology in 1977 where he was a member of Pi Kappa Alpha.

Early career (1978-1990)
Breedlove chose a career in the USAF as soon as he graduated from college. From March 1978 and going on for the next year, he was a student, undergraduate pilot training, at Williams Air Force Base, Arizona. From March until August of the next year, he was in pilot instructor training at Randolph Air Force Base, Texas. From August 1979 to January 1983, he became a T-37 Tweet instructor pilot, evaluation flight examiner and runway supervisory unit controller at Williams. He then became an F-16 Fighting Falcon student pilot at MacDill Air Force Base in Florida until September 1983. After that, he transferred to Torrejon Air Base, Spain, from September 1983 to January 1985, where he was the F-16 aircraft commander and instructor pilot for the 614th Tactical Fighter Squadron.

Breedlove became an air liaison officer from January 1985 to March 1987 with the 602nd Air Support Operations Group, Kitzingen Army Airfield, West Germany. He later transferred to the 526th Tactical Fighter Squadron, Ramstein Air Base, West Germany, from March 1987 to January 1988. Eventually, he was Chief of Flight Safety, 316th Air Division, at Ramstein, until August 1988. For the next two years, he became first an F-16 flight commander, then assistant operations officer of the 512th Tactical Fighter Squadron, also at Ramstein. From August 1990 to July 1991, he was a student at the Air Command and Staff College located at Maxwell Air Force Base, Alabama. Also in that year, he earned his Master of Science degree in aeronautical technology from Arizona State University.

In the General Staff (1991-2013)
Beginning in July 1991 and going to May 1993, he was the Chief of Air Operations, United Nations Command and Republic of Korea/United States Combined Forces Command, Yongsan Army Garrison, South Korea.

Starting in May 1993, Breedlove was the commander of the 80th Fighter Squadron at Kunsan Air Base, South Korea. This position lasted until July 1994, when he became a student at the National War College, Fort Lesley J. McNair, Washington D.C.. In June 1995, he became the operations officer, United States Pacific Command Division, Joint Staff, The Pentagon, Washington D.C., where he stayed until June. That next month, he became commander of the 27th Operations Group, Cannon Air Force Base, New Mexico. In June 1999 and going to that next May, he was the executive officer to the Commander, Headquarters Air Combat Command, Langley Air Force Base, Virginia. For the next year, he was the commander of the 8th Fighter Wing, Kunsan Air Base, South Korea. Beginning in June 2001 and lasting for the next year, he was the senior military assistant to the Secretary of the Air Force, Headquarters United States Air Force, Washington D.C.

From June 2002 to June 2004, he became the commander of the 56th Fighter Wing, located at Luke Air Force Base, Arizona. Then for the next year, he became commander of the 31st Fighter Wing, Aviano Air Base, Italy. He then became the vice commander of the 16th Air Force at Ramstein Air Base, Germany, from June 2005 to October 2006. His next assignment, which lasted until July 2008, had him as the Vice Director for Strategic Plans and Policy, Joint Staff, The Pentagon, Washington D.C.. From July 2008 to August 2009, he was the commander of the 3rd Air Force, located at Ramstein Air Base, Germany. In August 2009, he began serving as the Deputy Chief of Staff for Operations, Plans and Requirements, Headquarters United States Air Force, Washington D.C.

On January 14, 2011, Breedlove started his term as Vice Chief of Staff of the United States Air Force.  His promotion to general also was effective that day.

In July 2012 Breedlove left his position as Vice Chief of Staff to become commander of the United States Air Forces in Europe.

NATO Supreme Commander (2013-2016)

In May 2013 the Obama administration nominated Breedlove to assume command of U.S. European Command and NATO Allied Command Operations as the Supreme Allied Commander Europe. In that capacity, he was stationed at SHAPE Headquarters outside Mons, Belgium.

He is regularly quoted in western media. In July 2013, he told the BBC about his views on the longevity of the Afghan war. In April 2014, he spoke with CNN regarding the Russian troop buildup on the Ukrainian border.

In March 2015 he spoke on Ukrainian 1+1 channel on which he said that Russia has militarized Crimea.
In May 2015, he told the Atlantic Council that freedom is being challenged by "a revanchist Russia embarked on a reaching revision of what once were shared hopes for a stable and mutually beneficial partnership." In February 2016, during his testimony before the House Armed Services Committee, he said that "the U.S. military must rebuild in Europe to face a more aggressive Russia, which has chosen to be an adversary and poses a long-term existential threat to the United States".

On 11 March 2016, the North Atlantic Council designated US Army General Curtis Scaparrotti as Breedlove's successor. Scaparrotti took command in Europe on 4 May 2016.

Retirement activities
Breedlove is on the board of directors at the Atlantic Council, as well as being an advisory board member of Spirit of America, a 501(c)(3) organization that supports the safety and success of Americans serving abroad and the local people and partners they seek to help. Breedlove is also on the board of advisors of the Center for a New American Security (CNAS), a think tank funded by the likes of Northrop Grumman, Neal Blue of General Atomics, Lockheed Martin, and the U.S. government, among other governments and corporations.

on Ukraine
Speaking with a panel on the topic of the Ukraine border crisis at the Atlantic Council in December 2018, he outlined a range of measures which should be considered to counter Russian aggression such as financial targeting of certain Russian oligarchs, professionalization of Ukrainian military units, and providing to the Armed Forces of Ukraine shore-based cruise missiles and long-range precision artillery.

In June 2022 Breedlove appeared on a radio programme with Times of London and called for a muscular approach to the Putinian wheat crisis, which was rooted in blockade of the Port of Odessa by the Russian Black Sea Fleet, and chiefly affected Middle Eastern and North African countries.

Awards
Breedlove received the Golden Plate Award of the American Academy of Achievement presented by Awards Council member General Joseph W. Ralston, USAF, in 2014.

On May 1, 2015, Breedlove was presented with the Atlantic Council's Distinguished Military Leadership Award.

Decorations

Effective dates of promotion

See also
List of commanders of USAFE

References

External links

Photochart of USAF Leadership

|-

|-

|-

|-

|-

1955 births
Living people
United States Air Force generals
Georgia Tech alumni
Air Command and Staff College alumni
Ira A. Fulton Schools of Engineering alumni
National War College alumni
Recipients of the Legion of Merit
Recipients of the Defense Superior Service Medal
Recipients of the Military Order of the Cross of the Eagle, Class I
Vice Chiefs of Staff of the United States Air Force
NATO Supreme Allied Commanders
People from Forest Park, Georgia
Recipients of the Order of the Golden Fleece (Georgia)